Weld is a live album by Neil Young and Crazy Horse released in 1991, comprising performances recorded on the tour to promote the Ragged Glory album. It was initially released as a limited edition three-disc set entitled Arc-Weld, with the Arc portion being a single disc consisting in its entirety of a sound collage of guitar noise and feedback. Arc has since been released separately.

Weld consists of rock and roll songs by Young and Crazy Horse, duplicating seven that had appeared on either Rust Never Sleeps or Live Rust from twelve years earlier. It also echoes those albums as Young, in both cases having spent most of a previous decade pursuing different musical avenues, returned to straightforward rock and roll via the Ragged Glory album with Crazy Horse, then celebrating that return with an accompanying live document and concert film. The album includes Young's "Gulf War" version of Bob Dylan's "Blowin' in the Wind", which has air raid sound effects.

Weld was recorded by David Hewitt on Remote Recording Services' Silver Truck.

Neil Young states that he permanently damaged his hearing while mixing this album.

There was a brief release of the concert on VHS and laserdisc. The mix on the video is by longtime Young collaborator David Briggs and is a harder-edged, superior mix, according to biographer Jimmy McDonough in his book Shakey. The video was re-released in May 2009 for digital download.

Track listing 
All tracks written by Neil Young except where noted.

Disc one 
 "Hey Hey, My My (Into the Black)" (Young, Jeff Blackburn) – 5:42 (from Rust Never Sleeps)
 "Crime in the City" – 6:32 (from Freedom)
 "Blowin' in the Wind" (Bob Dylan) – 6:49
 "Welfare Mothers" – 7:04 (from Rust Never Sleeps)
 "Love to Burn" – 10:01 (from Ragged Glory)
 "Cinnamon Girl" – 4:45 (from Everybody Knows This is Nowhere)
 "Mansion on the Hill" – 6:14 (from Ragged Glory)
 "Fuckin' Up" – 7:09  (from Ragged Glory)

Disc two 
 "Cortez the Killer" – 9:46 (from Zuma)
 "Powderfinger" – 5:58 (from Rust Never Sleeps)
 "Love and Only Love" – 9:17 (from Ragged Glory)
 "Rockin' in the Free World" – 9:22 (from Freedom)
 "Like a Hurricane" – 14:00 (from American Stars 'n' Bars)
 "Farmer John" (Don Harris, Dewey Terry) – 5:00  (from Ragged Glory)
 "Tonight's the Night" – 8:45 (from Tonight's the Night)
 "Roll Another Number" – 5:19 (from Tonight's the Night)

Vinyl edition

Disc one 
 "Hey Hey, My My (Into the Black)" – 5:36
 "Crime in the City" – 6:33
 "Blowin' in the Wind" (Bob Dylan) – 6:36
 "Love to Burn" – 9:49
 "Welfare Mothers" – 7:08
 "Cinnamon Girl" – 4:39
 "Mansion on the Hill" – 6:13
 "Fuckin' Up" – 7:08 
 "Farmer John" (Don Harris, Dewey Terry) – 4:26

Disc two 
 "Cortez the Killer" – 9:47
 "Powderfinger" – 5:46
 "Love and Only Love" – 9:40
 "Roll Another Number" – 5:20
 "Rockin' in the Free World" – 8:44
 "Like a Hurricane" – 13:16
 "Tonight's the Night" – 8:07

Personnel
 Neil Young – guitar, vocals
Crazy Horse
 Ralph Molina – drums, vocals
 Frank "Poncho" Sampedro – guitar, Univox Stringman synthesizer, vocals
 Billy Talbot – bass, vocals

Charts

Certifications

References

Albums produced by David Briggs (producer)
Neil Young live albums
1991 live albums
Reprise Records live albums
Albums produced by Neil Young
Albums produced by Billy Talbot
Crazy Horse (band) albums

it:Arc / Weld